Presstoff (also Preßstoff or Pressstoff) is the German-language term for a type of ersatz or artificial leather used during the first half of the 20th century.  Made of specially layered and treated paper pulp, Presstoff was durable and easily adapted to be used in place of leather, which under wartime conditions was rationed.  First invented in the 19th century, it gained its widest use in Germany during the Second World War.

Military uses during WWII
Presstoff use included but was not limited to binoculars cases and straps, horse tack, bayonet frogs, equipment belts, cap visors etc.  In short, Presstoff could be used in almost every application normally filled by leather, excepting items like footwear that were repeatedly subjected to flex wear and/or moisture.  Under these conditions Presstoff tended to delaminate and lose cohesion.

Gallery

References

 

Artificial leather
German words and phrases
German culture